Live in Chicago is a DVD by the American singer-songwriter and Fleetwood Mac vocalist Stevie Nicks. It was filmed for PBS's Soundstage, on September 25, 2007 at Grainger Studios in Chicago, Illinois and the episode aired on television in July 2008. Its release is also accompanied with the live album, The Soundstage Sessions. The DVD is available in standard and Blu-ray editions. The DVD is certified gold in Australia.

Track listing
"Stand Back"
"Enchanted"
"If Anyone Falls"
"Rhiannon"
"Crash into Me" (Dave Matthews Band cover)
"Dreams"
"Sorcerer"
"The One" (duet with Vanessa Carlton)
"Gold Dust Woman"
"I Need to Know" (Tom Petty and the Heartbreakers cover)
"Circle Dance" (duet with Vanessa Carlton)
"Landslide"
"Sara"
"Fall from Grace"
"How Still My Love"
"Edge of Seventeen"
"Rock and Roll" (Led Zeppelin cover)
"Landslide" (Orchestral Version) (bonus track)

Personnel
Main Performers
 Stevie Nicks – vocals, producer
 Vanessa Carlton – guest performer
 Sharon Celani – backup vocals
 Lori Nicks – backup vocals
 Jana Anderson – backup vocals

Production
 Joe Thomas – producer
 Waddy Wachtel – producer
 Frank Pappalardo – engineering
 Michael Czaszwicz – Recording engineering
 Patrick DeWitte – assistant engineering
 Mixed at HD Ready, St. Charles

Musicians
 Waddy Wachtel – musical director/guitar
 Lenny Castro – percussion
 Al Ortiz – bass
 Jimmy Paxson – drums
 Ricky Peterson – keyboards
 Carlos Rios – guitar
 Darrell Smith – keyboards

Orchestra
 Eric Roth – conductor
 Janice MacDonald – flute
 Deb Stevenson – oboe
 Greg Flint – horn
 Christine Worthing – horn
 Guillaume Combet – violin
 Jennifer Cappelli – violin
 Carmen Llop-Kassinger – violin
 Christine Keiko Abe – violin
 Carol Cook – viola
 Jocelyn Davis-Beck – cello
 Eddie Bayers – drums
 Michael Rhodes – bass
 Joe Thomas – keyboards

Charts

Certifications

References

External links
 http://nickslive.blogspot.com/2009/04/live-in-chicago-first-week-sales.html

Stevie Nicks albums
Live video albums
2009 live albums
2009 video albums
Reprise Records live albums
Reprise Records video albums